Aisi, or Musak, is a Papuan language of Madang Province, Papua New Guinea.

Aisi is spoken in Musak, Kikerai, Banam, Sepu, and Garaligut villages in Usino Rural LLG. The largest Aisi-speaking villages are Sepu, Banam, and Musak, located just to the east of the Ramu River.

See also
Swadesh list of Aisi and Magɨ

References

Sogeram languages
Languages of Madang Province